Tero Koskela (born 13 October 1976) is a Finnish footballer who plays for Vaasan Palloseura.

References

 Hønefoss BK season statistics 
 Tero Koskela at Vaasan Palloseura web site 

1976 births
Living people
People from Kokkola
Finnish footballers
Veikkausliiga players
Eliteserien players
FC Jokerit players
FC Honka players
Tampere United players
Fredrikstad FK players
Hønefoss BK players
Vaasan Palloseura players
Kokkolan Palloveikot players
Finnish expatriate footballers
Finnish expatriate sportspeople in Norway
Expatriate footballers in Norway
Association football midfielders
Sportspeople from Central Ostrobothnia